Matt Pyzdrowski (born August 17, 1986 in Hinsdale, Illinois) is a retired American soccer player.

Career

College and Amateur
Pyzdrowski attended Fenwick High School in Oak Park, Illinois, played club soccer for HUSA soccer club, and played college soccer at the Marquette University from 2006 to 2009. He was named to the NSCAA All-Wisconsin team as a senior in 2009, and over his four years at Marquette received BIG EAST Goalkeeper of the Week honors on several occasions. He finished his career ranked fifth on the school's all-time list of goalkeepers with a 1.37 goals against average, 11 career shutouts and 206 career saves.

During his college years Pyzdrowski also played one season with the Chicago Fire Premier in the USL Premier Development League.

Professional
Pyzdrowski turned professional in 2010 when he signed with the Portland Timbers in the USSF Division-2 Professional League. He made his professional debut on April 22, 2010 in a game against AC St. Louis. He made his first professional start on August 21, 2010 against Minnesota where he made 3 saves en route to his first career shutout and a 1-0 victory.

Pyzdrowski left the Timbers following the conclusion of the 2010 USSFD2 season, and on March 1, 2011 signed with Ängelholm of Sweden's Superettan after a week-long trial where he impressed in a friendly match against Allsvenskan side Trelleborg FF and helped secure a 3-2 victory for Ängelholm.

In Pyzdrowski's first season as a starter for Ängelholm he appeared in every minute of every game leading the squad to 15 wins, 8 draws and 7 losses while racking up 8 shutouts and a third-place finish in the Swedish Superettan. Ängelholm qualified for the Allsvenskan promotion playoffs where they fell just short against Allsvenskan side Syrianska FC, 4-3 over two games. After the season, he received the 2011 Ängelholms FF "player of the year" award.

References

External links
 
 Marquette bio
 

1986 births
Living people
American soccer players
Chicago Fire U-23 players
Portland Timbers (2001–2010) players
Ängelholms FF players
Helsingborgs IF players
Varbergs BoIS players
USL League Two players
USSF Division 2 Professional League players
Superettan players
Allsvenskan players
People from Hinsdale, Illinois
Marquette Golden Eagles men's soccer players
Soccer players from Illinois
Sportspeople from DuPage County, Illinois
American expatriate soccer players
Expatriate footballers in Sweden
American expatriate sportspeople in Sweden
Association football goalkeepers